Olaf Hayer is a power metal vocalist from Gifhorn, Germany.

Career
Olaf Hayer began his career with Lord Byron in 1993, recording a demo in 1995 and the album "Fly free" in 2000. Until 2006, Hayer became part of Luca Turilli's band alongside singer Alessandro Conti (member of Trick or Treat). Turilli was famous as part of Rhapsody of Fire.

Later on he joined Dionysus, a Swedish power metal band with which he recorded three full-length albums. He became frontman of the band.

In 2008, he was part of Symphonity, a power metal band from the Czech Republic for their album Voice from the Silence (2008) and King of Persia (2016). He is a widower and has two children.

Discography
Treasure Seeker
 A Tribute to the Past (1998)

Lord Byron
 Fly Free (2000)

Dionysus
 Sign of Truth (2002)
 Anima Mundi (2004)
 Fairytales and Reality (2006)
 Keep the Spirit (2008) - Compilation

Luca Turilli
 King of the Nordic Twilight (1999)
 Prophet of the Last Eclipse (2002)
 The Infinite Wonders of Creation (2006)

Magic Kingdom
 Symphony of War (2010)

Symphonity
 Voice from the Silence (2008)
 King Of Persia (2016)

Guest appearances
 With Aina:
 Days of Rising Doom – vocals on "The Siege of Aina"

References

Living people
German male singers
Luca Turilli (band) members
Year of birth missing (living people)